Xinghai County is county under the jurisdiction of Hainan Tibetan Autonomous Prefecture, in the east-central part of Qinghai Province, People's Republic of China

Postal code: 813300; Area code: 0974

Settlements

Towns: Heka (河卡镇), Qushi'an (曲什安镇),  Ziketan (子科滩镇)

 Townships: Longzang Township (龙藏乡),  Tangnaihai Township (唐乃亥乡), Zhongtie Township (中铁乡), Wenquan Township (温泉乡)
Tsigorthang (Wenquan Twp)

Climate

See also
 List of administrative divisions of Qinghai

References

External links
Xinhuanet - Xinghai County website

County-level divisions of Qinghai
Hainan Tibetan Autonomous Prefecture